Maxine Louise Berg,  (born 22 February 1950) is a British historian and academic. Since 1998, she has been Professor of History at the University of Warwick. She has taught at Warwick since 1978, joining the Department of Economics, before transferring to History. She is a Fellow of the British Academy and of the Royal Historical Society.

Dr Berg obtained a doctorate from the University of Oxford.  Her thesis was entitled The machinery question: Conceptions of technical change in political economy during the industrial revolution, c. 1820 to 1840.

Selected publications
Books
 Berg, Maxine (2005) Luxury and Pleasure in Eighteenth-Century Britain, OUP 
 Berg, Maxine (1998) Technological Revolutions in Europe: Historical Perspectives, Edward Elgar.
 Berg, Maxine (1996) A Woman in History; Eileen Power 1889–1940, Cambridge
 Berg, Maxine (1994) The Age of Manufactures. Second Edition Routledge
 Berg, Maxine (1980) The Machinery Question and the Making of Political Economy 1815–1848, Cambridge University Press.

Papers

References 

1950 births
Living people
Academics of the University of Warwick
British women historians
Fellows of the Royal Historical Society
Fellows of the British Academy